Bob Benoit (born July 21, 1954, in Topeka, Kansas) is a retired professional bowler in the Professional Bowlers Association (PBA), who was active in the 1980s and 1990s. Over the course of his career, Benoit won four PBA Tour titles, all between 1988 and 1993.

PBA career
Benoit is mostly known for being the first bowler to ever roll a perfect game in a televised title match, as well as the fifth PBA bowler to throw a televised perfect game overall. He did this against Mark Roth, beating him 300–255, at the Quaker State Open on January 23, 1988. The victory was in front of his home crowd at the Forum Bowl in Grand Prairie, Texas, a place where Benoit bowled league during the eleven years in which he lived in Dallas. Only two other players have scored 300 in a televised title match since Benoit's feat: Mike Aulby in 1993 and Tommy Jones in 2020.

This was Benoit's first ever title, as well as his first appearance in a telecast, making him the first bowler in history to score 300 in their very first TV appearance. This distinction stood until 2016, when François Lavoie scored a 300 game in his first TV appearance, in the semifinal round of the 2016 U.S. Open. In that match, Lavoie defeated Shawn Maldonado, 300–211.

Benoit would later be on the other end of a televised 300 game, losing 300–236 to Butch Soper in a stepladder match of the Hilton Hotels Classic in July, 1994.

Benoit had 28 career top-five finishes and made it to the final match on eight occasions (wins in bold type):

January 23, 1988: Quaker State Open in Grand Prairie, TX (defeated Mark Roth)
January 21, 1989: Showboat Invitational in Las Vegas, Nevada (lost to Del Ballard Jr.)
February 16, 1991: Bud Light Classic in Sunrise, FL (defeated Wayne Webb)
March 9, 1991: Johnny Petraglia Open in North Brunswick, NJ (lost to Pete Weber)
June 1, 1991: Beaumont PBA Doubles Classic (w/Del Ballard Jr.) in Beaumont, TX (defeated Steve Hoskins and Philip Ringener)
July 6, 1991: El Paso Open in El Paso, TX (lost to Ray Edwards)
August 6, 1992: Senior/Touring Pro Doubles (w/Nelson Burton Jr.) in Belleville, IL (lost to Justin Hromek and Dick Weber)
July 17, 1993: El Paso Open in El Paso, TX (defeated Robert Lawrence)

Personal

Bob has a brother, Rick Benoit, who is still involved in the bowling business, formerly as a tour consultant for Brunswick, and currently coaches both PBA and PWBA bowlers. Rick has also founded and developed a bowling educational program known as BowlU.

Bob currently is a coach at Seaman High School, near Meriden, Kansas.

References 

1955 births
Living people
Sportspeople from Topeka, Kansas
Sportspeople from Dallas
American ten-pin bowling players